Loyola Heights is a barangay of Quezon City. According to the 2015 Census, it has a population of 18,884 people. It is an affluent district, containing high-end gated communities such as the Loyola Grand Villas, Xavierville, and Alta Vista Sundivision. It is the home to prestigious universities such as the Ateneo de Manila University and Miriam College. It was established on September 26, 1960, through City Ordinance No. 60-4512, which created the Barrio of Loyola Heights. It was named after Ignatius of Loyola, the founder of the Society of Jesus or Jesuits that also runs the Ateneo de Manila University.

Geography

A segment of the West Valley Fault traverses Loyola Heights.

References

Quezon City
Barangays of Quezon City
Barangays of Metro Manila